Cavazzo Carnico is a comune (municipality) in the Province of Udine in the Italian region Friuli-Venezia Giulia, located about  northwest of Trieste and about  northwest of Udine.

Cavazzo Carnico borders the following municipalities: Amaro, Bordano, Tolmezzo, Trasaghis, Venzone, Verzegnis, Vito d'Asio.

References

Cities and towns in Friuli-Venezia Giulia